The Critics' Choice Television Award for Best Comedy Series is one of the award categories presented annually by the Critics' Choice Television Awards (BTJA).

History
It was introduced in 2011 when the event was first initiated. The winners are selected by a group of television critics that are part of the Broadcast Television Critics Association.

Winners and nominees

2010s

2020s

Total wins by network 

 Amazon Prime Video – 3
 ABC – 2
 Apple TV+ – 2
 HBO – 2
 Netflix – 2
 CBS – 1
 NBC – 1

Total nominations by network 

 FX – 14
 HBO – 12
 ABC – 11
 Amazon Prime Video – 9
 CBS – 9
 NBC – 8
 Netflix – 7
 Hulu – 6
 Fox – 4
 HBO Max – 4
 Apple TV+ – 2
 Comedy Central – 2
 The CW – 2
 Pop TV – 2
 FXX – 1

Multiple wins
2 wins
 The Marvelous Mrs. Maisel (consecutive)
 Silicon Valley
 Ted Lasso (consecutive)

Multiple nominations
5 nominations
 The Big Bang Theory

4 nominations
 Modern Family
 Veep

3 nominations
 Barry
 Black-ish
 Louie
 The Marvelous Mrs. Maisel
 The Middle
 Mom
 Parks and Recreation
 Schitt's Creek
 Silicon Valley

2 nominations
 Atlanta
 Better Things
 Broad City
 Community
 Fleabag
 Hacks
 Jane the Virgin
 New Girl
 One Day at a Time
 PEN15
 Reservation Dogs
 Ted Lasso
 Transparent
 What We Do in the Shadows
 You're the Worst

See also
 TCA Award for Outstanding Achievement in Comedy
 Primetime Emmy Award for Outstanding Comedy Series
 Golden Globe Award for Best Television Series – Musical or Comedy
 Screen Actors Guild Award for Outstanding Performance by an Ensemble in a Comedy Series

References

External links
 

Critics' Choice Television Awards